UTC+05:45 is an identifier for a time offset from UTC of +05:45. The time zone is used in Nepal. It is one of only three time zones with a 45-minute offset from UTC.

As standard time (year-round) 
Principal cities: Kathmandu, Pokhara, Biratnagar

South Asia
Nepal – Nepal Standard Time has existed since 1986, when Nepal adopted the new time zone after they advanced their clocks by 15 minutes ahead of their previous time zone Indian Standard Time.

See also 
UTC+05:40
Nepal Standard Time

References 

Time in Nepal
UTC offsets

Notes